McCaffery is a surname. Notable people with the surname include:

Aidan McCaffery (born 1957), English footballer and manager
Anne McCaffery (1926–2011), American writer, winner of Hugo and Nebula awards
Christian McCaffrey (born 1996), American football player
Ed McCaffrey (born 1968), American football player
Edward McCaffery (born 1958), American legal scholar
Fran McCaffery (born 1959), American college basketball coach
Harry McCaffery (1858–1928), American baseball player
John McCaffery (1913–1983), American television host
Ken McCaffery (1929–2021), Australian rugby league player
Larry McCaffery (born 1946), American literary critic and editor
Margo McCaffery, American nurse
Seamus McCaffery (born 1950), American judge
Simon McCaffery (born 1963), American writer
Steve McCaffery (born 1947), Canadian poet and academic
Trudy McCaffery (1944–2007), racehorse owner and breeder
 Patrick McCaffery, (1844-1862), executed on 11 January 1862, who is the subject of the traditional song McCafferty

Fictional Characters
 Meg McCaffery, one of the main characters of The Trials of Apollo series by Rick Riordan. She is a demigod daughter of Demeter and Phillip McCaffery.

See also
McCafferty (disambiguation)